Christos Kostas Chelios (born January 25, 1962) is an American former professional ice hockey defenseman. He was one of the longest tenured players in the National Hockey League, and is a three-time Stanley Cup champion—one with the Montreal Canadiens and two with the Detroit Red Wings. 
 
Chelios played for the Montreal Canadiens, Chicago Blackhawks, Detroit Red Wings and the Atlanta Thrashers. When he was called up from the AHL's Chicago Wolves to play for the Thrashers during the 2009–10 NHL season, Chelios was the oldest active player in the NHL and the second oldest of all time. He had played the most games of any active player in the NHL, was the last player from the 1981 NHL Entry Draft still active (or any draft from 1986 and earlier), and had the most career penalty minutes of any active player. He is the former record-holder for most games played in the NHL by a defenseman, is eighth overall with 1,651 games played, holds the record for most career playoff games played with 266 and is tied with Gordie Howe for most NHL seasons played with 26. On May 1, 2009, he appeared in the playoffs for an NHL record 24th time, having missed the playoffs only once (1997–98). Chelios is also the record-holder for most career postseason losses, with 117 (also the most in any professional sport in North America). However, he only lost one Game 7 in his career, a 3–2 OT loss in the 1985 Adams Division Finals against the Nordiques. In 2017, Chelios was named one of the '100 Greatest NHL Players' in history.

Chelios is of Greek heritage. His cousin, Nikos Tselios, also played professional hockey and is a former first round draft pick of the Carolina Hurricanes. Chelios was inducted into the Hockey Hall of Fame on November 8, 2013.

Playing career

Early years
Chelios was born in Chicago, Illinois on January 25, 1962, and raised by his parents, Gus and Susan Chelios. They lived in Evergreen Park, Illinois. He attended Mount Carmel High School in Chicago until his family moved to Poway, California, where he attended Mira Mesa High School.

Unable to play high school hockey in Southern California, Chelios was not recruited by any U.S. colleges. His only scholarship offer came from San Diego-based United States International University, the only NCAA Division I hockey team west of the Rockies. However, when Chelios arrived on campus as a freshman in 1979, he soon realized he was in the wrong environment, facing bigger players with considerably more junior hockey experience. He was eventually cut from the team and considered quitting hockey. Instead, Chelios tried his luck in Canada, where he was twice cut by Junior B teams and hit a low point when he had to borrow money from strangers to get home to California one year. He said, "I wasn't any bigger or any better than the other guys, so they weren't going to take a kid from the States when they could have a local guy."

Chelios returned home and grew three inches while adding 40 pounds of muscle. He was then drafted by the Montreal Canadiens in the 1981 NHL Entry Draft. Prior to that, he played for the Moose Jaw Canucks of the Saskatchewan Junior Hockey League, where he tallied 87 points and 175 penalty minutes in just 54 games in his final season. Chelios then enjoyed two strong years playing for the Wisconsin Badgers at the University of Wisconsin–Madison after being drafted. As one of the top collegiate players in the country, he was selected for the United States team at the 1982 World Junior Ice Hockey Championship. In 1983, he was part of the Badgers' NCAA Men's Ice Hockey Championship team and was named to the all-tournament team and the second WCHA all-star team.

Chelios was a member of the U.S. team for the 1984 Winter Olympics in Sarajevo, Yugoslavia. After that, he made his debut for the Canadiens, playing 12 games in the regular season and 15 in the playoffs. That summer he joined the U.S. team at the 1984 Canada Cup.

Montreal Canadiens (1984–1990)
In 1984, Chelios made the Montreal Canadiens for good, distinguishing himself with his play. During his early days, he was known for his offensive abilities, and his teammates even called him "Soft Hands Chelios." He earned a trip to the National Hockey League All-Star Game and was named to the 1985 NHL All-Rookie Team. He scored 64 points in 74 games, a high total for a defenseman even in the high-scoring 1980s, and finished second to Mario Lemieux for the Calder Memorial Trophy. In the playoffs that year, he had 10 points in 9 games, with a +17 plus/minus. Although he only played 41 games in the 1985–86 season, he won his first Stanley Cup, playing in front of Conn Smythe Trophy-winning goaltender Patrick Roy.

Following two more good seasons in Montreal, Chelios really broke out in the 1988–89 campaign. He scored 73 points in 80 games at +35, was named to the All-Star first-team, and won his first James Norris Memorial Trophy. During that year's Wales Conference (now Eastern Conference) Finals series against the Philadelphia Flyers (which the Canadiens won in six games), Chelios became reviled by Flyer fans for a dirty hit on Brian Propp that left the Philadelphia winger with a serious concussion and forced him to miss the next game. The Flyers did not retaliate against Chelios until their fate was sealed late in Game 6; Flyers goaltender Ron Hextall memorably skated out of his net to attack Chelios, earning him a 12-game suspension.

After playing only 53 games the following season (in which he served as Canadiens' co-captain, with Guy Carbonneau, making Chelios the first non-Canadian player to captain the Canadiens), Chelios was traded to the Chicago Blackhawks on June 29, 1990, with a 2nd-round draft pick for Denis Savard. The trade occurred one day after Chelios was accused of fighting with two police officers as they tried to arrest him for urinating in public outside a bar in downtown Madison, Wisconsin, according to a criminal complaint.

Chicago Blackhawks (1990–1999)
In his first season with Chicago, Chelios continued to score at his usual rate, tallying 64 points, and earned a spot on the Second NHL All-Star team. He helped lead the Blackhawks to the Stanley Cup Final in 1992, where they were swept by the Pittsburgh Penguins. He was in top form for the 1992–93 season, scoring 73 points and winning his second James Norris Memorial Trophy. His Norris Trophy-winning play, which some sports reporters referred to as "Sweet", earned him the nickname "Honey Nut". The nickname derives from his name being spelled and pronounced similarly to the famous breakfast cereal, Honey Nut Cheerios.

During the 1994–95 NHL lockout he played for EHC Biel in the Swiss National League A.

For the 1995–96 season, Chelios was named captain of the Blackhawks, a role he served in until 1999. He enjoyed another fine season, scoring 72 points and winning his third James Norris Memorial Trophy. In the summer of 1996, he helped lead the United States to its biggest international hockey win since the 1980 Winter Olympics, as the Americans defeated Canada in the 1996 World Cup of Hockey. Chelios was named to the All-Tournament Team.

Detroit Red Wings (1999–2009)
At 37, Chelios could still help teams with his veteran leadership and his largely remaining talent. On March 23, 1999, he was traded to the Detroit Red Wings for Anders Eriksson and two first-round draft picks.

The move to Detroit, where he had fewer responsibilities and more skilled teammates, helped keep Chelios playing at close to his peak level. In 2002, his +40 plus/minus led the league, and he was again named to the first All-Star team. He also led the United States hockey team to a silver medal in the 2002 Winter Olympics, and was named to the Tournament's All-Star team. His season culminated in the Red Wings' victory over the Carolina Hurricanes in the Stanley Cup Finals, giving Chelios his second Stanley Cup.

In 2004, because of the cancellation of the NHL season, Chelios, along with fellow Red Wing teammates Derian Hatcher and Kris Draper, decided to play hockey for the Motor City Mechanics, a UHL team based out of Fraser, Michigan. He was heavily criticized for this decision as the UHL has a maximum salary in place, but at the same time he was strongly against a salary cap in the NHL. In October 2004 he trained with the U.S. bobsled federation in a bid to compete for the Greek bobsled team at the 2006 Winter Olympics. While Chelios didn't compete in the bobsled, he did captain the USA hockey team at the 2006 Winter Olympics in Turin, Italy.

On August 4, 2005, the 43-year-old re-signed with the Red Wings for a one-year contract. On May 24, 2006, Chelios re-signed a one-year contract with the Detroit Red Wings. On July 3, 2006, Chelios became the active leader for most games played upon the retirement of teammate Steve Yzerman. On April 21, 2007, he became the oldest defenseman to score a short-handed goal in the NHL in a playoff game against the Calgary Flames.

Chelios was the captain of the US Olympic Hockey Team that played at the 2006 Winter Olympics in Torino, Italy. By participating in ice hockey at the 2006 Winter Olympics, Chelios set a new standard, by becoming the first player to take part in an Olympic ice hockey tournament, twenty-two years after he played in his first. The old record was set by Swiss hockey player Bibi Torriani who had played twenty years after his debut (1928 and 1948).

Chelios re-signed with the Detroit Red Wings for the 2007–08 season. On January 8, 2008, Chelios became the second oldest player in the history of the NHL, at 45 years, 348 days, passing Moe Roberts. Only Gordie Howe, who played until age 52, was older. On April 12, 2008, Chelios played in his 248th playoff game, breaking the NHL record set by Hall of Fame goaltender Patrick Roy. Later that season, Chelios also became the oldest active player to win the Stanley Cup.

Chelios signed another one-year contract with the Red Wings for the 2008–09 season. On December 5, 2008, Chelios played in his first of two games for the Grand Rapids Griffins, the American Hockey League (AHL) farm club for the Red Wings, as part of a conditioning stint. At 46 years of age, he became the oldest player in the 73-year history of the AHL. At the conclusion of the 2008–09 season, Chelios was a finalist for the Bill Masterton Memorial Trophy.

Chicago Wolves and Atlanta Thrashers
After the Red Wings announced that they would not be re-signing Chelios, he signed a 25-game pro tryout contract with the Chicago Wolves. After a second 25-game pro tryout contract with the Wolves, Chelios signed a two-way contract with the Atlanta Thrashers. Chelios remained with the Wolves until he was recalled to the Thrashers, hoping that he could provide a spark for the team's playoff hopes. He played in seven games for the Thrashers, but failed to record any points. On April 7, 2010, Chelios was sent back to the Wolves.

Retirement, transition to Wings front office, and broadcasting
On August 31, 2010, Chelios officially retired. He was 48 years of age. The same day, Red Wings general manager Ken Holland announced that Chelios would be hired to work in the Red Wings' front office. He was named Adviser to Hockey Operations, with a role of working with Red Wings' defense prospects in Grand Rapids.

In 2013, it was announced that Chelios would become an NHL analyst on FS1, which also included covering the hockey tournament in the 2014 Winter Olympics.

In 2016, Chelios, along with former Red Wings teammate Brett Hull, was added to ESPN’s roster of analysts for their coverage of the 2016 World Cup of Hockey, which ESPN had picked up the U.S. broadcast rights to, after NBC pulled out due to scheduling conflicts.

In July 2018, Chelios announced that he was leaving the Detroit area, and the Red Wings front office, to return to Chicago to be close to his family.  At the same time, the Chicago Blackhawks announced that Chelios was being brought on board to serve as an ambassador for the franchise.

In 2021, after ESPN regained the rights to broadcast the NHL, Chelios rejoined the network for their coverage. Chelios serves the same studio analyst role he held for the 2016 World Cup of Hockey, and sits alongside Barry Melrose and Mark Messier, joining Steve Levy for games on ESPN, ABC, and ESPN+.

Coaching career
On June 17, 2015, USA Hockey named Chelios an assistant coach for Team USA at the 2016 World Junior Ice Hockey Championships.

On June 23, 2015, Chelios was named to the Red Wings coaching staff, where he will continue to play a role in player development, by working on-ice with the team's defensemen during practices. His job involved evaluating in-game player performance and offering his insight and observations to Red Wings bench coaches. He would also attend all home games, and on occasion, join the club on the road.

International play
Chelios has participated in 11 international tournaments for the United States:
1980 World Junior Ice Hockey Championships
1982 World Junior Ice Hockey Championships
1984 Winter Olympics
1984 Canada Cup
1987 Canada Cup
1991 Canada Cup
1996 World Cup of Hockey (alternate captain)
1998 Winter Olympics (captain)
2002 Winter Olympics (captain)
2004 World Cup of Hockey (captain)
2006 Winter Olympics (captain)

In 2020, Chelios was named into the IIHF All-Time USA Team.

Personal life
Chelios grew up in Chicago, Illinois, where his father, Constantine "Gus" Chelios, owned a chain of Greek restaurants. The family name was originally "Tselios", but Gus chose to change the family's spelling. The family moved to Poway, California, in 1977, when his father left his struggling business in Chicago to open a restaurant in the San Diego area. He was a Chicago Blackhawks fan during his childhood but was more focused on football, idolizing Chicago Bears linebacker Dick Butkus. Chelios attended Mount Carmel High School (Chicago) before his family moved west, and then finished prep studies at Mira Mesa Senior High School in San Diego.

Chelios and his wife Tracee were married in 1987. They met while students at the University of Wisconsin–Madison. They have four children: Dean (born 1989), Jake (born 1991), Caley (born 1993), and Tara (born 1996). Dean Chelios, a forward, scored a pair of power play goals to help his Cranbrook-Kingswood high school team win the 2006 Division III Michigan state high school hockey championship. Dean played for the Chicago Steel of the USHL in Bensenville, Illinois, and last played in 2016 for the Wichita Thunder of the ECHL. In May 2009, Jake was drafted 49th overall by the Chicago Steel, and joined his brother at Michigan State. Jake is a defenseman, like his father, and currently plays with the Grand Rapids Griffins in the Detroit Red Wings organization. Caley graduated from Northwestern University and is currently a reporter for the Chicago Blackhawks.

Chelios was very active in charitable causes during his playing time in Chicago, founding Cheli's Children."

Chris is the older brother of former minor-leaguer Steve Chelios, and cousin of former NHL player Nikos Tselios.

Through his career, Chelios has befriended many non-hockey athletes and entertainers. In 2004, he and surfer Laird Hamilton trained with the U.S. bobsled team and hoped to form the first Greek bobsled team at the 2006 Winter Olympics. Chelios and his family can be found Stand up paddle surfing with Hamilton. Chris credits the activity with helping him maintain his long career.

On Scrubs, Dr. Perry Cox, played by Chelios' friend John C. McGinley, often wears a Red Wings jersey with Chelios' name and number. During the fourth season of the show, which was concurrent with the 2004–05 lockout, Cox was seen on at least one occasion wearing a No. 24 "Motor City Mechanics" jersey. Chelios is also close friends with actors John Cusack and D. B. Sweeney, Pearl Jam frontman Eddie Vedder, Smashing Pumpkins frontman Billy Corgan, and musician Kid Rock. Chelios was sitting courtside with Kid Rock during the Pacers-Pistons brawl at the Palace of Auburn Hills on November 19, 2004. Chelios and Sweeney are quite close, with the two having appeared together in The Cutting Edge (1992) and Two Tickets to Paradise (2007), in addition to Chelios being the godfather to Sweeney's son, Cade.

Chelios was a regular at Michigan State University hockey games, cheering on his sons Jake and Dean.

DUI arrest
On December 28, 2009, in Westmont, Illinois, Chelios was arrested for driving under the influence. He was the only occupant of the vehicle that was stopped at 4 a.m. The vehicle was towed and Chelios was taken to the Westmont station, where he was charged, processed, and posted bond. In March 2010, a judge reviewed the video tape of the arrest. The case was dismissed for lack of probable cause to stop, and evidence the tape provided that Chelios was not impaired. He was however fined for improper lane usage and speeding.

Malibu Mob
Chelios maintains a home in Malibu, California, and is well known as a member of the group of celebrity home owners and friends called the Malibu Mob. Other members include tennis great John McEnroe, big-wave surfer Laird Hamilton and his beach volleyball professional wife Gabrielle Reece, musicians Tim Commerford and Kid Rock, and actors John C. McGinley, John Cusack, Kelsey Grammer, Tony Danza, Justin Long, and Ed O'Neill.

Business

Chelios has owned restaurant/bars in both the Chicago and Detroit areas, all under the name Cheli's Chili Bar. The first operated on West Madison Street in Chicago (near the United Center) in the 1990s, but closed after his move to the Red Wings. A new Cheli's opened in Dearborn in 2003, followed by a second location in Detroit in 2006 and a third in Clinton Township in 2008. All three are now closed, with the Detroit location shuttering in 2018 upon Chelios returning to live in the Windy City. He has indicated a desire to open a new restaurant in the Chicago area.

On January 2, 2007, two employees of Cheli's in Detroit were fatally stabbed: Megan Soroka, 49, a manager at the restaurant, and Mark Barnard, 52, a chef. Police arrested Justin Blackshere, 17, who confessed to the crime. He was a busboy at the restaurant and was fired in November 2006. Blackshere's pregnant girlfriend had also been fired from her job as a dishwasher. Chelios took a leave of absence from the Red Wings to help the families of his murdered employees. He said, "I'll come back when I feel ready and the families feel ready. I'm just going to try to get through this day by day with everybody." On January 9, 2007, the Red Wings announced that Chelios would be playing that night. Blackshere was found guilty of murder in the first degree on August 22, 2007, and was sentenced to life in prison without parole on September 7, 2007.

Career statistics
Bold italics indicate NHL record

Regular season and playoffs

International

Awards and honors

Records
Games played in the regular season by a defenseman (1,651)
Games played in the playoffs (266)

See also
List of NHL players with 1,000 games played
List of NHL players with 2,000 career penalty minutes

References

External links
 
 Chris Chelios' bio @ hockeydraftcentral.com
 Chris Chelios: Made in America by Chris Chelios, Kevin Allen

1962 births
American expatriate sportspeople in Switzerland
American men's ice hockey defensemen
American people of Greek descent
American restaurateurs
Atlanta Thrashers players
Businesspeople from Chicago
Chicago Blackhawks captains
Chicago Blackhawks players
Chicago Wolves players
Detroit Red Wings coaches
Detroit Red Wings personnel
Detroit Red Wings players
EHC Biel players
Grand Rapids Griffins players
Hockey Hall of Fame inductees
Ice hockey players from Illinois
Ice hockey players at the 1984 Winter Olympics
Ice hockey players at the 1998 Winter Olympics
Ice hockey players at the 2002 Winter Olympics
Ice hockey players at the 2006 Winter Olympics
IIHF Hall of Fame inductees
James Norris Memorial Trophy winners
Living people
Medalists at the 2002 Winter Olympics
Montreal Canadiens draft picks
Montreal Canadiens players
Moose Jaw Canucks players
National Hockey League All-Stars
NCAA men's ice hockey national champions
Olympic silver medalists for the United States in ice hockey
People from Evergreen Park, Illinois
Stanley Cup champions
United States men's national ice hockey team coaches
Wisconsin Badgers men's ice hockey players